Bromodifluoromethane or Halon 1201 or FC-22B1 is a gaseous trihalomethane or a hydrobromofluorocarbon.

Synthesis
It can be prepared through the reaction of hydrogen and dibromodifluoromethane at temperature in range 400–600 °C.

Critical point data: Tc = 138.83 °C (411.98K); pc = 5.2MPa (51.32bar); Vc = 0.275dm3·mol−1.

Applications
Bromodifluoromethane was used as a refrigerant and in fire extinguishers. It is a class I ozone depleting substance with ozone depletion potential ODP = 0.74. It was banned by Montreal Protocol in 1996.

References

External links 

Halomethanes
Ozone depletion
Fire suppression agents
Refrigerants
Organobromides
Organofluorides